Minyadyn is a rural locality (a village) in Beloyevskoye Rural Settlement, Kudymkarsky District, Perm Krai, Russia. The population was 23 as of 2010.

Geography 
Minyadyn is located 14 km northwest of Kudymkar (the district's administrative centre) by road. Kurdyukova is the nearest rural locality.

References 

Rural localities in Kudymkarsky District